Gustavo Ramírez may refer to:

 Gustavo Ramírez (wrestler) (born 1941), Guatemalan wrestler
 Gustavo Ramírez Villarreal (born 1964), Mexican politician
 Gustavo Ramírez (footballer, born 1984), Paraguayan football forward
 Gustavo Ramírez (footballer, born 1990), Paraguayan football forward